The Missions Abroad and Special Operations (in German: Auslands- und Spezialeinsätze, abbreviated BKA-ASE) is a specialized unit within the German Federal Criminal Police Office (BKA). The ASE is composed of specially selected and trained BKA personnel that typically operate in high-threat environments.

History

Background and creation 
On August 15, 2007, three BKA agents who served as part of the security detail of the German Ambassador of Afghanistan were killed. This proved that the personnel conducting these tasks were not appropriately trained and prepared to face the threat of attacks which became increasingly complex. This led to dramatic changes of the protection of the diplomatic missions in hazardous areas.

The Federal Police tasked their special security details for diplomatic missions of protecting embassies and their personnel while the BKA saw the need of establishing a similar unit to operate in hostile environments.

The BKA's protection division has drawn from the experiences of previous deployments of security details which showed the need of military-style tactics, equipment and training. Selected agents of the BKA were trained by the German Military's special operations unit KSK and the ASE became fully operational in 2008. Until this day BKA ASE maintains strong relationships with similar domestic and international special operations units

Controversy 
On 20 April 2021, the President of the BKA published a statement regarding ongoing investigations against members of the ASE. In different cases legal and disciplinary investigations were initiated due to various cases of misconduct.

Mission 
Tasks
 ASE may operate as close protection details in hazardous areas. 
 Functions as counter assault teams. In the event a VIP, the VIP's vehicle, or a protected site is attacked or ambushed by armed assailants, ASE operators may be tasked with engaging and diverting the attackers, thereby buying the close protection shift time to evacuate the dignitary to a safe area.
Tasked with the protection of German constitutional organs of the federal government such as the German President, Bundeskanzler and Ministers during their visits to foreign crisis regions.
Provides tactical support to foreign high-profile state guests during their stay in Germany.
Provides high-risk escort of witnesses within the witness protection tasks of the BKA and the escort of high-profile and dangerous prisoners.

ASE operates closely with the close protection details of the BKA or with other special units of the German Police such as the protection unit for German Diplomatic Missions.

Deployments
Since its establishment ASE engaged in over 200 missions (as of 2019). Missions abroad have been conducted in Iraq, Mali, Pakistan, Israel, Lebanon, Yemen, Nigeria, Libya, Somalia among others.
Recent domestic deployments include the International Conference on Afghanistan, Bonn (2011), the 41st G7 summit in Bavaria and the 2017 G20 Hamburg summit.

Organisation 

ASE is a sub-section of the BKA Protection Division in Berlin.  It is composed of elite members of the BKA Protection Division chosen through a highly competitive and selective process. The unit is subdivided in two operational teams: ASE Alpha and ASE Bravo.

Selection and training 

Members of the BKA and other German police services can apply for the selection process of the ASE.

During the selection process candidates have to complete the following tests

 Physical fitness which includes a 3000 m run, benchpress and an obstacle course
 Marksmanship and weapons handling
 Self-defense and hand-to-hand fighting
 Psychological examinations
 Oral interviews

Upon successful completion of the selection phase, ASE operators attend the standard personal security detail training by the BKA's Protection Division and further specialization courses.
These involve advanced firearm handling, combatives, tactics in high-threat environments or advanced medical training.

Equipment 

Weaponry
 Assault rifle HK G36K
 Assault rifle HK G36C
 Submachine gun HK MP5
 Submachine gun HK MP7
 Pistol SIG Sauer P229.

Personal equipment

Further equipment depends on the theater and may include night vision goggles, plate carriers and ballistic helmets or ballistic shields.
Depending on the mission ASE operators are usually dressed in low-profile civilian attire or in khaki battle dress uniforms.

Vehicles
 Mercedes-Benz G-Class
 Armoured vehicles

The BKA does not have its own air assets so ASE operators use capabilities of the German Federal Police's aviation unit.

Further reading 
 Sören Sünkler: ASE SG BKA, Auslands- und Spezialeinsätze Sicherungsgruppe Bundeskriminalamt. In: Kommando-International Special Operations Magazine, Nr. 2/2019 März/April, ISSN 2196-1204, S. 4-23.

See also
 PSA BPOL
 DSS Mobile Security Deployments
 Secret Service Counter Assault Team

External links 
 Video clip on the German Military's official YouTube channel on a joint training exercise of the German Military's special operations unit KSK and the BKA ASE.

References

Police units of Germany
Non-military counterterrorist organizations
Specialist law enforcement agencies of Germany
Protective security units